Exodeoxyribonuclease (lambda-induced) (EC 3.1.11.3, lambda exonuclease, phage lambda-induced exonuclease, Escherichia coli exonuclease IV, E. coli exonuclease IV, exodeoxyribonuclease IV, exonuclease IV) is an exonuclease. This enzyme catalyses the following chemical reaction

 Exonucleolytic cleavage in the 5′- to 3′-direction to yield nucleoside 5′-phosphates

This enzyme has preference for double-stranded DNA (dsDNA). This means that it degrades a single strand of dsDNA, primarily any strand which has a phosphate at its 5' end.

References

External links 
 

EC 3.1.11